The Diocese of Hierapetra and Sitia (also Hierapytna or Gerapitna) was a Roman Catholic diocese located in the city of Hierapetra in the southeast of the Greek island of Crete when it was under Venetian rule. It was suppressed sometime in the 1600s.

History
1200s: Established as Diocese of Hierapetra
1650?: Suppressed
1933: Restored as Titular Episcopal See of Hierapetra

Ordinaries

Diocese of Hierapetra
Latin Name: Hierapetrensis
Philippe Bartolomei (14 Apr 1480 – 1501 Died) 
Ippolito Arrivabene (20 Dec 1542 – 1564 Resigned) 
Nicolaus Bertholdi (14 Jul 1564 – 20 Jun 1571 Died)

Diocese of Hierapetra and Sitia
16 July 1571: United with the Diocese of Sitia
Latin Name: Hierapetrensis et Sythiensis

Gaspare Viviani (16 Jul 1571 – 3 Aug 1579 Appointed, Bishop of Anagni)
Alexander de Turre, C.R.L. (31 Jan 1594 – 1624 Died)
Pierre Pisani, O.F.M. (7 Oct 1624 – 1634 Resigned) 
Georges Minotti (21 Aug 1634 Appointed – )

References

Former Roman Catholic dioceses in Greece
Ierapetra
Kingdom of Candia
13th-century establishments in Europe